Galitsky is a Russian surname. Notable people with the surname include:

 Alexander Galitsky (born 1955), international technology entrepreneur
 Kuzma Galitsky (1897–1973), Soviet army general
 Sergey Galitsky (born 1967), Russian billionaire businessman

Russian-language surnames